Armstrong is an unincorporated community in Armstrong Township, Vanderburgh County, in the U.S. state of Indiana.

History
A post office was established at Armstrong in 1856, and remained in operation until it was discontinued in 1957.

Geography

References

Unincorporated communities in Vanderburgh County, Indiana
Unincorporated communities in Indiana